Jemnice is a town in Třebíč District in the Vysočina Region of the Czech Republic. It has about 4,000 inhabitants. The historic town centre is well preserved and is protected by law as an urban monument zone.

Administrative parts
Villages of Louka and Panenská are administrative parts of Jemnice. Panenská forms an exclave of the municipal territory.

Etymology
The name is derived from jámy, i.e. "pits", and jamník, which is an old Czech word for "miner". It is connected with the mining history of the place.

Geography
It lies mostly in the Jevišovice Uplands. There are several ponds in the territory.

History

The predecessor of Jemnice is Podolí, which was founded in the 11th century as a mining settlement. A new town on a high promontory above the river Želetavka was founded before 1226. The first written mention of Jemnice is in a deed of King Ottokar I of Bohemia from 1227. It was a royal town until 1530. Town fortifications were mentioned in 1327. Jemnice resisted during minor wars, however it was conquered and burned down by army of Matthias Corvinus in 1468.

The mining in the vicinity of the town continued until the war times in the 15th century. After that, it was never successfully renewed and the main source of livelihood was agriculture and fish farming.

Demographics

Sights

Most of the preserved houses in the historic centre have a Gothic or Renaissance core. About  of town walls and three bastions have been preserved to this day.

The original Gothic castle from the 13th century was rebuilt into a Renaissance residence in the 16th century. After 1734, Baroque reconstruction was made, and interiors were renovated in the Empire style after 1818. The last major reconstruction took place in the second half of the 19th century and stables, a brewery and administrative buildings were added. Since 1994, the castle has been in possession of the town and is open to the public.

There are three churches in the town. The landmark of the town square is the Church of Saint Stanislaus. It was founded in the 14th century and rebuilt in the Renaissance style in the 1580s. In the oldest part of the town is the Church of Saint James the Great, which stands on the site of a Romanesque rotunda from the 11th or 12th century. The late Gothic chancel was built in 1515.

The third church is the late Gothic Church of Saint Vitus. It was built as a part of a Franciscan monastery founded in 1455. After its abolition in the late 17th century, the monastery fell into disrepair and gradually disappeared. Only underground spaces have been preserved.

Notable people
Hugo Charlemont (1850–1939), Austrian painter
Roman Havelka (1877–1950), painter
Karel Werner (1925–2019), indologist, orientalist and philosopher of religion

Twin towns – sister cities

Jemnice is twinned with:
 Raabs an der Thaya, Austria
 Reszel, Poland

References

External links

Cities and towns in the Czech Republic
Populated places in Třebíč District